Amar Gërxhaliu (born 	26 April 2002) is a Kosovan professional footballer who plays as a centre-back for Turkish club Antalyaspor.

Club career
His debut with Antalyaspor came on 9 November 2022 in the 2022–23 Turkish Cup fourth round against Pendikspor after being named in the starting line-up. On 28 January 2023, Gërxhaliu made his league debut in a 3–2 home win against Ümraniyespor after coming on as a substitute at the 72nd minute in place of Ömer Toprak.

International career
On 8 August 2019, Gërxhaliu received a call-up from Albania U18 for the friendly match against Romania U18. His debut with Albania U18 came seven days later in a friendly match against Romania U18 after being named in the starting line-up.

On 15 September 2022, Gërxhaliu received a call-up from Kosovo U21 for a training camp held in Antalya, Turkey and for the hybrid friendly match against Greenland.

References

External links

2002 births
Living people
Sportspeople from Vushtrri
Kosovan footballers
Kosovo under-21 international footballers
Kosovan expatriate footballers
Kosovan expatriate sportspeople in Turkey
Albanian footballers
Albania youth international footballers
Albanian expatriate footballers
Albanian expatriate sportspeople in Turkey
Association football central defenders
İstanbul Başakşehir F.K. players
KF Vushtrria players
Süper Lig players
Antalyaspor footballers